Kutaisi International Airport  also known as David the Builder Kutaisi International Airport is an airport located  west of Kutaisi, the third largest city in Georgia and capital of the western region of Imereti. It is one of three international airports currently in operation in Georgia, along with Tbilisi International Airport serving the Georgian capital and Batumi International Airport near the Adjara Black Sea resort. The airport is operated by United Airports of Georgia, a state-owned company.

History
The airport was closed for renovation in November 2011. Its reopening ceremony was held on 27 September 2012. It was attended by President of Georgia Mikheil Saakashvili, Prime Minister of Hungary, Viktor Orbán and Wizz Air CEO József Váradi.

For preparation works, for the commissioning of the airport and training of staff, the French company Vinci Airports was contracted. There is one duty-free shop and two coffee shops operating at the airport. The airport is currently connected to scheduled buses operated by Georgian Bus   and Omnibus Express  
, with services to Kutaisi, Tbilisi and Batumi after each arrival. The airport terminal is located next to the main road between Kutaisi and Batumi, so it is possible to transfer to those cities also by marshrutka.

The priority of Kutaisi airport is to attract low-cost airlines. A significant growth in the number of passenger has been noted soon after the reopening of the airport in 2012, mainly due to Wizz Air operations linking Kutaisi with European airports. For 2013, the airport reported 187,939 passengers. In February 2016, Wizz Air announced a new base at Kutaisi Airport and is planning to add a second base in 2018.

Currently, major expansion works of the airport are underway as the airport is expecting 1 million passengers in 2020. A plan to build a railway station in the vicinity of the airport which would connect the airport to Tbilisi, Batumi and any other cities of Georgia served by Georgian Railways was announced in 2018. In April 2022 the modernization of the Kopitnari station was finished.

Airlines and destinations

Statistics

Passenger figures

Busiest routes

See also 
List of the busiest airports in the former USSR
List of airports in Georgia
Transport in Georgia

References

External links

Airports in Georgia (country)